The Hlai languages are a primary branch of the Kra–Dai language family spoken in the mountains of central and south-central Hainan in China by the Hlai people, not to be confused with the colloquial name for the Leizhou branch of Min Chinese. They include Cun, whose speakers are ethnically distinct. A quarter of Hlai speakers are monolingual. None of the Hlai languages had a writing system until the 1950s, when the Latin script was adopted for Ha.

Classification
Norquest (2007) classifies the Hlai languages as follows. Individual languages are highlighted in bold. There are some 750,000 Hlai speakers.

Proto-Hlai 
 Bouhin (Heitu 黑土) – 73,000
Greater Hlai
Ha Em 哈炎 (Zhongsha 中沙) – 193,000
Central Hlai
East Central Hlai – 344,000
 Lauhut (Baoding 保定) – 166,000, the basis of the literary language
Qi 杞   also known as Gei – 178,000
 Tongzha (Tongshi 通什) – 125,000
 Zandui (Qiandui 堑对) – 29,000
 Baoting 保亭 – 24,000
North Central Hlai – 136,500
Northwest Central Hlai – 62,500
Cun (Ngan Fon, Gelong 仡隆) – 60,000
 Nadou (Dongfang 东方) – 2,500
Northeast Central Hlai – 74,000
Meifu 美孚 (Moifau) – 30,000
 Changjiang 昌江
 Moyfaw (Xifang 西方)
Run  (Zwn)  also known as Bendi – 44,000
 Baisha 白沙 – 36,000
 Yuanmen 元门 – 8,000

The Fuma 府玛 dialect is spoken in one village north of Changjiang 昌城, Hainan. It had about 800 speakers in 1994.

Jiamao 加茂 (52,000) is a divergent Kra-Dai language with a Hlai superstratum and a non-Hlai substratum.

Reconstruction

The Proto-Hlai language is the reconstructed ancestor of the Hlai languages. Proto-Hlai reconstructions include those of Matisoff (1988), Thurgood (1991), Ostapirat (2004), and Norquest (2007).

Phonology 
The following displays the phonological features of the modern Hlai dialects:

Consonants 

[], [] mainly occur among the Xifang dialects.

Vowels 

  occurs among some dialects.

History
Liang & Zhang (1996:18-21) conclude that the original homeland of the Hlai languages was the Leizhou Peninsula, and estimate that the Hlai had migrated across the Hainan Strait to Hainan island about 4,000 years before present.

See also
List of Proto-Hlai reconstructions (Wiktionary)
Has Hlai grammar
Hlai people
Proto-Hlai language

Notes

References

Further reading
Miyake, Marc. 2013. The other Kra-Dai numerals (Parts 1, 2).
Miyake, Marc. 2011. Is Jiamao Hlai?
Miyake, Marc. 2008. Hlai -ɯ.
Miyake, Marc. 2008. Implosives on Hainan. (Parts 1, 2).
Miyake, Marc. 2008. Hlai initial verification.
Miyake, Marc. 2008. Hlai initial glides.
Miyake, Marc. 2008. Hlai palatal codas.
中国科学院少数民族语言调查第一工作队海南分队编. 1957. Guanyu huafen Liyu fangyan he chuangzuo Liwen de yijian 关于划分黎语方言和创作黎文的意见. 黎族语言文字问题科学讨论会.

External links
 Bible recordings in various Hlai languages
 ABVD: Proto-Hlai word list
 Hlai-language Swadesh vocabulary list of basic words (from Wiktionary's Swadesh-list appendix)
 Hlai languages learning website (both in Mandarin Chinese and English)